"Nothing to Lose" is a Dance-pop/electronic single recorded by Australian singer/songwriter Vassy, and co-produced with Tiësto. The track became her third number one single in the United States on Billboard's Dance Club Songs chart, reaching the summit in its February 4, 2017 issue.

Track listings
Digital download
"Nothing to Lose" - 3:28

Digital download (Remixes)
Nothing To Lose (Kue Remix) 
Nothing To Lose (Kue Radio Mix) 
Nothing To Lose (Anders Young Remix) 
Nothing To Lose (Kobe Bourne And JK West Remix) 
Nothing To Lose (OBIS Remix) 
Nothing To Lose (Brierley Remix) 
Nothing To Lose (Kue Radio Edit)

Charts

Weekly charts

Year-end charts

References

External links
Official Video at YouTube

2016 songs
2016 singles
2017 singles
Dance-pop songs
Electronic songs
House music songs
Songs written by Vassy (singer)
Songs written by Tiësto